Gok or GOK may refer to:

People 
 Göktürks, a Turkic people of ancient Central Asia
 Gok Wan (born 1974), British fashion consultant, author and television presenter
 Azim Gök (born 1996), Iranian footballer
 Emin Gök (born 1988), Turkish volleyball player
 Levent Gök (born 1959), Turkish politician

Other uses 
 Gök River, in Turkey
 Gok State, South Sudan
 Geokinetics
 Government of Kenya
 Guthrie–Edmond Regional Airport, in Oklahoma